Michael F. Holick (born 1946) is an American adult endocrinologist, specializing in vitamin D, such as the identification of both calcidiol, the major circulating form of vitamin D, and calcitriol, the active form of vitamin D. His work has  been the basis for   diagnostic tests and therapies for vitamin D-related diseases. He is a professor of medicine at the Boston University Medical Center and editor-in-chief of the journal Clinical Laboratory.

Professional activities
After earning a Ph.D. degree in biochemistry, a medical degree, and completing a research postdoctoral fellowship at the University of Wisconsin–Madison, Holick completed a residency in medicine at the Massachusetts General Hospital in Boston.

He is an adult endocrinologist and professor of medicine, physiology and biophysics and director of the Bone Health Care Clinic and the Heliotherapy, Light, and Skin Research Center at Boston University Medical Center. It provides extensive evaluation and treatment programs for children and adults with various metabolic bone diseases including osteoporosis, osteomalacia, stress fractures in young athletic women and men, and minimum trauma and nontraumatic fractures in infants, children and adults with hypermobility syndromes, Osteogenesis imperfecta, and Ehlers Danlos Syndrome. He has been director of the General Clinical Research Unit at Boston University for several years.

Holick serves as chair of NASA's "Human Health Countermeasures Element" Standing Review Panel, chair of the Endocrine Practice Guidelines Committee for Vitamin D, and editor-in-chief of the medical journal Clinical Laboratory.

Academic achievements and research
Holick made   discoveries in the field of vitamin D that have led to novel   therapies for metabolic bone diseases, hypocalcemic disorders, and psoriasis. He is author of more than 400 publications about the biochemistry, physiology, metabolism and photobiology of vitamin D and the pathophysiology of vitamin D deficiency.

His scientific work increased awareness in the pediatric and medical communities regarding vitamin D deficiency, and its role in causing not only metabolic bone disease, and osteoporosis in adults, but increasing risk of children and adults developing common deadly cancers, autoimmune diseases, including type 1 diabetes, multiple sclerosis and heart disease, as discussed in his review article.

He has been quoted and his scientific work has been referenced in The New York Times, Forbes, Newsweek, Men's Health, Scientific American and Time. 
He wrote several books about the importance of vitamin D and its beneficial health effects to the broad public, and discussed the benefits of sensible and the risks of excessive sun exposure.

As a graduate student, he identified the major circulating form of vitamin D, 25-hydroxyvitamin D3, which is the vitamin D metabolite that is measured by physicians worldwide to determine a patient's vitamin D status. He also identified the active form of vitamin D, 1,25-dihydroxyvitamin D3, as well as other metabolites including 24,25-dihydroxyvitamin D3, 1,24,25-trihydroxyvitamin D3 and 25,26-dihydroxyvitamin D3.

As a fellow, he participated in the first chemical synthesis of 1,25-dihydroxyvitamin D3 and 1α-hydroxyvitamin D3 to treat renal osteodystrophy, hypoparathyroidism, vitamin D dependent rickets type I, and osteoporosis. Furthermore, he elucidated the pathophysiology of hereditary vitamin D-dependent rickets which involves defective vitamin D metabolism, and the pathophysiological mechanisms of X-linked hypophosphatemic rickets.

Holick helped develop the first clinical assays for 25-hydroxyvitamin D and 1,25-dihydroxyvitamin D, determined how vitamin D3 is made in the skin from sun exposure, and established how season, time of day, skin pigmentation, sunscreen use, and latitude influenced this vital cutaneous process.
He established that the skin was not only the organ responsible for making vitamin D3 but was also a target tissue for its active form, 1,25-dihydroxyvitamin D3. He determined the extremely inhibitory effects of 1,25-dihydroxyvitamin D3 on keratinocyte proliferation and the promoting effects on differentiation, and translated these seminal observations by demonstrating that the topical application of 1,25-dihydroxyvitamin D3 and several of its analogs were effective for the treatment of psoriasis.

He demonstrated that macrophages and prostate cells have the enzymatic machinery to produce 1,25-dihydroxyvitamin D3, and established that the extrarenal production of 1,25-dihydroxyvitamin D3 may play a crucial role not only in cancer prevention but also in regulating the immune system.

He developed a vitamin D absorption test and demonstrated that vitamin D was bioavailable in orange juice, leading to fortification of juice products in the United States. He also used the test to demonstrate the major cause of vitamin D deficiency in obesity is sequestration of vitamin D in the fat.

He helped perform dose escalation studies establishing how much vitamin D is required to maintain blood levels of 25-hydroxyvitamin D in the sufficient range for adults. These studies also demonstrated that up to 10,000 IU of vitamin D a day for 5 months did not cause toxicity.

Controversies 
Holick has been involved in several medical controversies. While at Boston University, he was asked to leave the Division of Dermatology because of his promoting the medical benefits of sun exposure. He accepted research funding for this work from a non-profit tanning bed company, considered by many to be an important potential bias. Barbara Gilchrest, then head of the department at Boston University, called Holick's book "shlock science" and Holick "a poster boy for the tanning industry".

Holick received nearly $163,000 from 2013 to 2017 from pharmaceutical companies, according to Medicare’s Open Payments database, which tracks payments from drug and device manufacturers. The companies paying him included Sanofi-Aventis, which markets vitamin D supplements; Shire, which makes drugs for hormonal disorders that are given with vitamin D; Amgen, which makes an osteoporosis treatment; and Roche Diagnostics and Quidel Corp., which both make vitamin D tests.

Holick has also been criticized by other physicians because of his testimony, defending accused child abusers by asserting that Ehlers-Danlos Syndrome is a cause of non-traumatic fractures in infancy (rather than abuse). In one case of a child who had suffered broken bones in which Holick defended the accused parent, the child later went on to suffer severe brain injury, for which the parent has been indicted.

Since May 2017, Holick has been barred from evaluating or treating children by Boston Medical Center, which subsequently reported him to the Massachusetts Board of Registration in Medicine for "health care facility discipline", but is still allowed to evaluate children who are participating in his research project. Boston University has defended Holick's right to testify in courts, as part of his academic freedom.

In January 2018, Robert Marvin Ray, one of the parents whom Holick worked with over child abuse suspicions, was arrested and charged with child abuse.

Holick has speculated that the dinosaurs may have died of rickets and osteomalacia caused by a lack of vitamin D in reduced sunlight.

Awards
Holick has been awarded for his contributions to the field of vitamin D research with prizes, including:

 Merit Award from the National Institute of Health
 American Society for Bone and Mineral Research Fuller Albright Award
 Mead Johnson Award
 Osborne and Mendel Award, the McCollum Award
 Robert H. Herman Award from the American Society for Clinical Nutrition
 ACN Award from the American College of Nutrition
 NIH’s General Clinical Research Center's Program Award for Excellence in Clinical Research
 Psoriasis Research Achievement Award from the American Skin Association
 DSM Innovation in Nutrition Award
 Van Slyke Award from American Association for Clinical Chemistry
 Linus Pauling Prize In Human Nutrition
 Delbert A Fisher Research Scholar Award from the Endocrine Society
 American College of Nutrition's Communication Media Award
 Institute of Functional Medicine’s LPI Award 2007

Selected publications

Books

Scientific journal articles

References

External links
Boston University School of Medicine: Michael F. Holick
Harvard Catalyst Profiles: Michael Holick

Last capture of VitaminDhealth.org
Dr. Holick’s current webpage

1946 births
Living people
American endocrinologists
Boston University faculty
Light therapy advocates